John Greig  (born 11 September 1942) is a Scottish former professional footballer, who played as a defender. He spent his entire career with Rangers, as a player, manager and director. Greig was voted "The Greatest Ever Ranger" in 1999 by the club's supporters, and has been elected to Rangers' Hall of Fame.

Playing career

Youth 
Greig played his youth football with United Crossroads Boys Club in Edinburgh, under the supervision of Eric Gardiner, and supported Hearts as a boy. It is unknown if Hearts showed any interest in signing him. Bob McAuley signed Greig for Rangers and despite his initial reluctance Greig did as instructed by his father. However, after viewing a match between Rangers and Hibernian at Easter Road, where he witnessed them beating Hibs 6–1, he was convinced the move was right.

Club career 
A determined, forceful player, recognised for his great leadership qualities, Greig made 755 official appearances for Rangers (498 in the domestic league, 72 in the Scottish Cup, a club record 121 in the League Cup and 64 in European tournaments). He scored 120 goals for the club and won three domestic trebles. Greig actually started his career with Rangers as a forward, prior to being moved back to midfield—playing initially alongside another Rangers legend in Jim Baxter—and finally to left back. It was therefore in those initial years that he scored the majority of his goals for the club.

Greig was captain when Rangers won the European Cup Winners Cup in 1972 beating Dynamo Moscow 3–2 in Barcelona. Although Greig's was an enormously successful playing career, his captaincy coincided with a period of sustained success for Rangers' city rivals, Celtic, from the late 1960s until the mid-1970s. Greig's fortitude during that period further cemented his reputation as one of Rangers' most celebrated captains.

He was granted a testimonial match in 1978 against a Scotland XI as part of the national squad's preparations for the 1978 FIFA World Cup; Rangers won 5–0 before a crowd of 65,000 at Ibrox.

International career 
Greig played for Scotland on 44 occasions, 15 as captain, between 1964 and 1975. He scored the late winner in Scotland's 1–0 victory against Italy at Hampden Park on 9 November 1965 and in 1967 achieved the distinction of captaining the Scottish side who beat England 3-2—their first defeat as World Champions—at Wembley. Greig also represented the Scottish League XI 14 times.

Managerial career 
Greig's playing career ended in May 1978 when he was appointed manager of Rangers, replacing Jock Wallace. The club failed to win the league championship during Greig's time as manager, finishing no higher than the second place achieved in 1978–79. Greig's team had come close to winning a domestic treble and performed well in Europe in that first season. Rangers reached the quarter-final of the 1978–79 European Cup, defeating Italian champions Juventus and becoming the first club to win in European club competition at PSV's Philips Stadion, before eventual elimination to Cologne. There was also the partial compensation of success in domestic cup competitions, with two Scottish Cups and two League Cups secured over the course of Greig's five full seasons as manager. Greig was also responsible for signing Rangers' greatest ever goalscorer Ally McCoist from Sunderland. However, these were isolated achievements, and Greig—under intense pressure from the Scottish media, Rangers supporters and the club's directors—resigned in October 1983, replaced by the returning Wallace.

Post-football career 
After leaving Rangers, Greig worked as a pundit for Radio Scotland and BBC television. He returned in 1990 as part of the club's public relations team. Dick Advocaat, manager of Rangers from 1998 to 2001, re-involved Greig in football coaching during which time he contributed to youth development. In 2003, he joined the Rangers board of directors. Greig resigned this position in October 2011, soon after the takeover of the club by Craig Whyte. Greig and John McClelland, who resigned at the same time as Greig, stated that they had been excluded from the corporate governance of the club since Whyte had taken control. Greig later re-joined Rangers on 23 May 2015, when he was named the club's honorary life president with ambassadorial responsibilities.

Career statistics

Club

International appearances

International goals 
Scores and results list Scotland's goal tally first

Honours 

Greig was made a Member of the Order of the British Empire (MBE) on 15 November 1977. In June 2008, he was awarded honoris causa, from the University of Glasgow in recognition for outstanding achievement in football and continuing ambassadorship for the sport.

As a player

Club 
Rangers
UEFA Cup Winners' Cup: 1971–72
Scottish League First Division/Premier Division (5): 1962–63, 1963–64, 1974–75, 1975–76, 1977–78
Scottish Cup (6): 1962–63, 1963–64, 1965–66, 1972–73, 1975–76, 1977–78
Scottish League Cup (4): 1963–64, 1964–65, 1975–76, 1977–78

Individual 
SFWA Footballer of the Year: 1965–66, 1975–76
Scottish Football Hall of Fame (inaugural inductee)
Scottish Sports Hall of Fame (inaugural inductee)
Ballon d'Or: 1972 (18th place)

As a manager 
Scottish Cup: 1978–79, 1980–81
Scottish League Cup: 1978–79, 1981–82

See also
List of one-club men in association football
List of Scotland national football team captains

References

External links 
 
 Manager profile - John Greig Rangers FC
 Hall of Fame - John Greig,  Rangers FC

1942 births
Living people
Members of the Order of the British Empire
Footballers from Edinburgh
Rangers F.C. managers
Rangers F.C. players
Scotland international footballers
Scottish Football League players
Scottish football managers
Scottish footballers
Scottish Football Hall of Fame inductees
Scottish Football League representative players
Scotland under-23 international footballers
Scottish Football League managers
Association football defenders
Directors of football clubs in Scotland